Erik Derycke (born 1970) is a Belgian quiz player best known for his success with the national team and his double gold at the European Quizzing Championships (EQC) 2007 with his partner Tom Trogh.

Quiz
He has been a national team member since 2003 when his team won the "England-Belgium interland", the precursor of the EQC. Derycke has won three European titles in 2005, 2006 and 2008, Silver in five other competitions and Bronze in 2011 with the national site.

He also won the EQC double title with national teammate Tom Trogh (also from Leuven) in 2007, and Silver in 2011. The other two national players are Ronny Swiggers and Nico Pattyn.

With his club "Clockwork" (line-up Tom Trogh, Marnix Baes, Bart Permentier) he won European Silver in 2007 and Bronze in 2010 and 2013.

His strongest subject is Culture. In individual competition he reached the 9th place three times at the World Quizzing Championships, in 2005, 2006 and 2010.

Outside quizzing
He studied Germanic Literature, and now works as the chief editor of Belgian photography magazine "Shoot" which severely limits his time to quiz.

References

External links
Bio at Quizmeisterschaften
His club Clockwork

1970 births
Living people
IQA team event gold medalists